Galeana is one of the 67 municipalities of Chihuahua, in northern Mexico. The municipal seat lies at Hermenegildo Galeana. The municipality covers an area of 1,529 km².

As of 2010, the municipality had a total population of 5,892, up from 3,774 as of 2005.

The municipality had 109 localities, the largest of which (with 2010 populations in parentheses) were: Abdenago C. García (Lagunitas) (2,113) and Colonia Le Barón (2,104), classified as rural.

References

Municipalities of Chihuahua (state)